Falls of the Ohio State Park is a state park in the U.S. state of Indiana. It is located on the banks of the Ohio River at Clarksville, Indiana, across from Louisville, Kentucky. The park is part of the Falls of the Ohio National Wildlife Conservation Area. The exposed fossil beds of the Jeffersonville Limestone dated from the Devonian period are the main feature of the park, attracting about 160,000 visitors annually. The Falls was the site where Lewis and Clark met for the Lewis and Clark Expedition at George Rogers Clark's cabin.

The park includes an interpretive center open to the public. In 1990, the Indiana state government hired Terry Chase, a well-established exhibit developer, to design the center's displays. The center functions as a museum with exhibits that concentrate on the natural history related to findings in the nearby fossil beds as well as the human history of the Louisville area, covering pre-settlement, early settlement, and the history of Louisville and southern Indiana through the 20th century.

Unlike at other Indiana state parks, annual entrance permits do not allow unlimited free access (rather, only five people per pass per visit) to the interpretive center, as fees are still needed to reimburse the town of Clarksville for building the center.

The Woodland Loop Trail features ten stainless steel markers denoting the plant life of the trails, thanks to an Eagle Scout project.

Strange wildlife has been seen in the park, including alligators and crocodiles. Humorously, in August 2006, a fisherman hooked a dead octopus, but Zachary Treitz, a 21-year-old Louisville college student, admitted he had put the octopus there after purchasing it dead from a local seafood shop for a film project.

Gallery

See also
The Filson Historical Society
List of attractions and events in the Louisville metropolitan area
List of fossil sites
Old Clarksville Site
Falls of the Ohio National Wildlife Conservation Area: More information about the geology of the Falls

References

WikiMapia

External links

Falls of the Ohio Organization
Falls of the Ohio State Park - Indiana Department of Natural Resources
 Silurian and Devonian Geology and Paleontology at the Falls of the Ohio, Kentucky/Indiana - 42nd Annual Meeting of the American Institute of Professional Geologists, fieldtrip guidebook, 2005

Protected areas established in 1990
Clarksville, Indiana
History of Louisville, Kentucky
State parks of Indiana
Ohio River
Paleozoic paleontological sites of North America
Natural history museums in Indiana
Museums in Clark County, Indiana
Protected areas of Clark County, Indiana
Nature centers in Indiana
Fossil parks in the United States
Paleontology in Indiana
Local museums in the United States
1990 establishments in Indiana
Devonian paleontological sites